Peak Practice is a British drama series about a GP surgery in Cardale—a small fictional town in the Derbyshire Peak District—and the doctors who worked there. It ran on ITV from 10 May 1993 to 30 January 2002 and was one of their most successful series at the time. It originally starred Kevin Whately as Dr Jack Kerruish, Amanda Burton as Dr Beth Glover and Simon Shepherd as Dr Will Preston, though the roster of doctors would change many times over the course of the series. The series was axed in 2002, ending on a literal cliffhanger when two of the series' main characters plunged off a cliff and did not show what happened to them.

Cardale was based on the Staffordshire village of Longnor for the final series, but was previously based in the Derbyshire village of Crich, although certain scenes were filmed at other nearby Derbyshire towns and villages, most notably Fritchley, Matlock, Belper, Duffield and Ashover.

Synopsis

Series 1 – 1993
Dr Jack Kerruish returns to the UK after setting up a clinic in Africa. He has dreams of being a country GP and heads to Derbyshire for an interview at the Beeches surgery. The Beeches is run by Dr Beth Glover who took the practice over from her father when he died. Beth's partner at the practice is Dr Will Preston who, at this time, would prefer a day on the golf course to a full day's surgery. After initial tensions and despite Will's concerns, Beth invites Jack to be a partner at the practice. Jack and Beth share an instant chemistry and after several misunderstandings they finally get together towards the end of Series 1. Will on the other hand faces marital problems with his wife Sarah. He is broken when he discovers she has been having an affair with Daniel Acres, a doctor from the rival health centre. Pressure to keep her and their two children, Tony and Julien, in a posh house results in Will committing a fraudulent drugs trial. When his scam is revealed, Sarah threatens to leave him, and in turn Will has a nervous breakdown. Meanwhile, after years of trying for a baby, landlords of the local pub Chloe and James White have a daughter named Sarah-Jane.

Series 2 – 1994
Jack and Beth have grown closer during the series break and in the opening episode, Jack asks for Beth's hand in marriage. She turns him down in fear that she hasn't done enough with her life, and although they try to stay together, they later split up. Will and Sarah struggle to make their marriage work and move to a smaller house to help their financial worries. They face further problems when their son Tony is involved in a serious fight at school and also when Sarah continues to attract male attention. Chloe is diagnosed with Hodgkins disease and faces a tough regime of treatment. Mid series, and Jack and Beth both contend with lovers from their past returning to their lives. After a near-death situation, Beth realises she wants to spend her life with Jack and proposes to him. As Jack and Beth marry, Sarah leaves Will and he once again hits rock bottom. Meanwhile, Chloe gets the good news that she is in remission and as the series ends, The Beeches becomes a fund holding practice.

Series 3 – 1995
Jack and Beth have been married for a year and face problems when they each encounter personal difficulties. Beth is rocked by the death of her best friend Isabel De Gines, and Jack feels victimised when a family he tried to help make a complaint against him. Beth decides she wants to start a family but Jack gets an offer to continue his work in Africa. Despite Beth's pleas Jack leaves the practice for a few months. Will and Sarah divorce but find it hard to lead separate lives. On several occasions, they almost give into temptation but Will realises they are better off apart. Whilst in Africa, Jack realises how much he has changed and how much he misses Beth. He returns to Cardale and they try for a family. Beth soon falls pregnant but happiness turns to tragedy when she loses the baby. The Beeches take on trainee GP Andrew Attwood (Gary Mavers) and he moves into the pub whilst completing his exams. Andrew makes Will feel unsettled at the Beeches and he decides to take a job in an inner-city practice. Beth too is looking for a change and finds it hard to shake off her miscarriage. After Will decides to stay on at the Beeches, Jack and Beth decide to take a 6-month sabbatical to Africa.

Series 4 – 1996
A year on, and Jack and Beth have still not returned from Africa. They tell Will they wish to open a clinic out there and he is left to look after The Beeches. He is also hit by the news that Sarah is remarrying and taking Tony and Julien to live in America. Andrew continues to work at The Beeches and is joined by his wife Kirsty. She tries hard to settle into Cardale life but the pair have their problems and Kirsty returns to Liverpool. Dr Erica Matthews arrives as a locum and is instantly attracted to Will. They share a kiss but he develops a friendship with Dr Kate Webster from a rival practice. Their relationship becomes serious and Will tries his hardest to play Dad to Kate's son Charlie. Andrew struggles to cope without Kirsty and is unaware when a patient falls for him. When he knocks her back, she makes a complaint against him and Andrew turns to Erica for comfort. They spend the night together but Andrew soon regrets it when Kirsty returns to Cardale. He is honest with her and they decide to move back to Liverpool. Chloe and James become foster parents and she continues to remain in remission. At the end of the series, Kate finds out she is pregnant and despite booking in for a termination, she changes her mind and she and Will decide to settle down together. Erica buys an old cottage and lays her roots in Cardale, and realising they have grown apart, Kirsty decides to return to Liverpool without Andrew.

Series 5 – 1997
Dr David Shearer arrives in Cardale to help out at the Beeches. He is an old friend of Beth and Will's and covers the absence of Andrew, who went missing after his split with Kirsty. David's wife Clare and their children Emma and Tom join him in Cardale and he quickly settles back into country life. Much to the annoyance of Andrew, who returns looking for another chance from Will and Erica. Kate gives birth to a baby girl named Emily. However, she and Will soon find out that their baby is sick and their worst fears are realised when Emily is diagnosed with Cystic Fibrosis. A clinic in Bristol offers Emily a place on their programme, resulting in Will and Kate leaving Cardale. Before they go, they get married and leave the Beeches in the hands of Andrew, Erica and David. David faces torment when Claire is diagnosed with manic depression, Andrew is rocked when Kirsty arrives with a child that is not his and Andrew and Erica continue to dance around the idea of having a relationship.

Series 6 – 1998

Series 7 – early 1999

Series 8 – late 1999

Series 9 – early 2000

Series 10 – late 2000

Series 11 – early 2001
Will's friends ignore his professional advice; Sam invests in a controversial new drug; and Will clashes with ex-wife Kate over an alcoholic patient.

Series 12 – late 2001/early 2002
Tom is involved in a climbing accident; new nurse Claire (Eva Pope) wastes little time in making her presence felt at the practice; and a deadly epidemic puts strain on the Beeches.

Episodes

DVD release
Series 1–7 have been released on DVD. Series 8 – 12 have not been released yet.

List of characters

Dr Jack Kerruish – Kevin Whately (1993–1995)
Dr Beth Glover – Amanda Burton (1993–1995)
Dr Will Preston – Simon Shepherd (1993–1997; 2000–2002)
Dr Andrew Attwood – Gary Mavers (1995–2000)
Norman Shorthose – Clive Swift (1998)
Isabel de Gines – Sylvia Syms (1993–1995)
Kim Beardsmore – Esther Coles (1993–1999)
Ellie Ndebala – Sharon Hinds (1993–1994)
Chloe White – Hazel Ellerby (1993–1998)
James White – Richard Platt (1993–1998)
Alice North – Margery Mason
Trevor Sharpe – Shaun Prendergast (Guest 1993; regular 1994–1995)
Leanda Sharpe – Beth Goddard (recurring 1993–1995)
Sarah Preston – Jacqueline Leonard (recurring 1993–1996)
Douglas Hart – Maurice Denham (recurring 1993–1994)
Laura Elliott – Veronica Roberts (1995–1998)
Erica Matthews – Saskia Wickham (1996–1998)
Kate Webster/Preston – Shelagh McLeod (1996–1997; 2000–2002)
Kirsty Attwood – Sukie Smith (recurring 1996, guest 1997)
Dr David Shearer – Adrian Lukis (1997–1999)
Clare Shearer – Yolanda Vazquez (1997) / Fiona Gillies (1998–1999)
Dawn Rudge – Sarah Parish (guest 1997; 1998–1999)
Dr Joanna Graham – Haydn Gwynne (1999–2000)
Dr Martin Henderson – Christian Burgess (Recurring 1999)
Dr Sam Morgan – Joseph Millson (1999–2001)
Carol Johnson – Deborah Grant (2000–2002)
Kerri Davidson – Susannah Corbett (2000–2002)
Dr Tom Deneley – Gray O'Brien (2000–2002)
Dr Alex Redman – Maggie O'Neill (2000–2002)
Claire Brightwell – Eva Pope (2001–2002)

References

External links
Peak Practice Online

 Peak Practice and Jason O'Mara 

1993 British television series debuts
2002 British television series endings
1990s British drama television series
2000s British drama television series
Amber Valley
ITV television dramas
Television series by ITV Studios
Television shows set in Derbyshire
English-language television shows
Television shows produced by Central Independent Television
Carlton Television
1990s British medical television series
2000s British medical television series